OP Andromedae is a variable star in the constellation Andromeda. Varying between magnitudes 6.27 and 6.41 over 2.36 days, it has been classified as an RS Canum Venaticorum variable, but there has not been any proof of binarity, yet. It is a red giant star with a spectral classification of K1III.

OP Andromedae is one of the few red giant stars where it was detected an overabundance of 7Li. The mechanism that enhances lithium in red giants is still unknown. It was proposed that those stars engulfed planets in the recent past; however, this theory was discarded since there is an overabundance of just one lithium isotope.

References

Andromeda (constellation)
009746
Andromedae, OP
K-type giants
RS Canum Venaticorum variables
0454
007493
Durchmusterung objects